Julia Sugawara (born November 27, 1982) is a Canadian rugby union player. She has represented  at three World Cups in 2006, 2010, and 2014.

Sugawara plays for Burnaby Lake and represents the province of BC. She spent a year with the Saracens in 2009-2010. Returning to British Columbia, she coaches a BC Highschool team in Surrey/White Rock and also referees high school and division 2 women's games.

In 2011, she was awarded the Colette McAuley Award for her consistent efforts giving back to the game of rugby.

Sugawara studied at Trinity Western University and has a Bachelor's and Master's degree in Linguistics. She is a teacher's aide for special needs children.

References

External links
Player profile at Rugby Canada 

1982 births
Living people
Canadian female rugby union players
Canada women's international rugby union players
Female rugby union players
Canadian sportspeople of Asian descent
Women referees and umpires